Frøstrup (anglicised as Frostrup) is a Norwegian surname which may refer to:

Anne Cathrine Frøstrup (born 1954), Norwegian civil servant
Johan Frøstrup (1852–1929), Norwegian judge and politician
Mariella Frostrup (born 1962), British journalist and television presenter